The 2022–23 season is the 73rd season in the existence of Burton Albion Football Club and the club's fifth consecutive season in League One. In addition to the league, they will also compete in the 2022–23 FA Cup, the 2022–23 EFL Cup and the 2022–23 EFL Trophy.

Transfers

In

Out

Loans in

Loans out

Pre-season and friendlies
Burton announced a pre-season home match with Birmingham City on 19 May 2022. Northern Premier League Division One Midlands side Belper Town revealed a friendly with Burton on 24 May. A second home friendly match, against Sheffield United was added. Along with an away trip to Brackley Town. On June 7, the Brewers confirmed a pre-season fixture against Hibernian during a warm-weather training camp in Vilamoura, Portugal. Later, on June 24, the Brewers added further matches to the pre-season schedule - against Stratford Town, Burnley and Mickleover. A ninth match as part of pre-season was confirmed against Nottingham Forest. On July 25, the Brewers announced an XI side will travel to local side Staphenhill three days after the season opener.

Mid-season

Competitions

Overall record

League One

League table

Results summary

Results by round

Matches

On 23 June, the league fixtures were announced.

FA Cup

The Brewers were drawn at home to Needham Market in the first round, and to Chippenham Town in the second round and away to Grimsby Town in the third round.

EFL Cup

Burton Albion were drawn away to Rochdale in the first round.

EFL Trophy

On 20 June, the initial Group stage draw was made, grouping Burton Albion with Bradford City and Sheffield Wednesday. Three days later, Leicester City U21s joined Northern Group H. The Brewers were then drawn at home to Tranmere Rovers in the second round and to Accrington Stanley in the third round.

References

Burton Albion
Burton Albion F.C. seasons
English football clubs 2022–23 season